Abu Dhabi Global Market (ADGM) is an international financial centre and free zone located on Al Maryah Island in the United Arab Emirates's capital, Abu Dhabi. The financial centre was established in 2013 and became fully operational in October 2015. It has three authorities – the financial services regulator, the registration bureau and the ADGM courts.

In January 2015, the Abu Dhabi Global Market announced that it had renamed the location it was based in, “Sowwah Square”, to "Abu Dhabi Global Market Square".

ADGM regulates the trading of digital assets and became an attractive jurisdiction for crypto companies after it introduced digital asset regulation in 2018. That same year ADGM joined the World Alliance of International Financial Centers.

See also
List of financial regulatory authorities by country
List of company registers

References

External links
Official website
Abu Dhabi Global Market (ADGM) – MSATC

2013 establishments in the United Arab Emirates
Organizations established in 2013
Organisations based in Abu Dhabi
Geography of Abu Dhabi
Economy of the Emirate of Abu Dhabi
Financial districts in the United Arab Emirates
Free-trade zones of the United Arab Emirates